Caristanius decoloralis is a moth of the family Pyralidae described by Francis Walker in 1863. It is native to North America, where it has been recorded from North Carolina, Florida and eastern Texas. It is an introduced species in Hawaii.

External links
Bug Guide
Images at the Moth Photographers Group of Mississippi State University

Moths described in 1863
Phycitinae